Paradise Food Court is a restaurant located on MG Road, Secunderabad, in the Indian state of Telangana. It is reported to be popular for its Hyderabadi biryani and other Hyderabadi dishes.

History

The Paradise restaurant, founded in 1953, began as a small cafe serving tea and snacks, but now it serves traditional Hyderabadi, Indian and Chinese continental delicacies. The hotel is known for Hyderabadi dishes.

Restaurant

Paradise Hotel serves Hyderabadi dum biryani, Kebabs, Chinese cuisine, Tandoori cuisine, and Hyderabadi haleem during the month of Ramzan.

Awards

The hotel has received awards from publications like Times of India and Burrp.
 Second prize - Best Haleem at 2011 Times Biryani and Haleem contest
 First prize - Best Biryani 2012 Times Food Award
 Best Biryani Ever by Kutti Karishma Krishnan
 Great Place to Work
 Limca Book of Records for "Most Biyani Servings Sold in a Year".
 At the Asia Food Congress, Paradise received "Restaurant Serving the Best Biryani" award

Gallery

References

Restaurants in Hyderabad, India
Hotels in Hyderabad
1953 establishments in India
Restaurants established in 1953